The Polynesia Cup was a football tournament for Polynesian nations within the Oceania Football Confederation. It acted along with the Melanesia Cup as a qualifying tournament for the OFC Nations Cup.  The last tournament was played in 2000.

The tournament involved a round-robin format where every team played each other once at the location of the tournament.

Participating nations

Results

Records

Total Wins

All-time table

Footnotes

 
Oceania Football Confederation competitions
Defunct international association football competitions in Oceania
OFC Nations Cup qualification
Recurring sporting events established in 1994
Recurring sporting events disestablished in 2000
1994 establishments in Oceania
2000 disestablishments in Oceania